Cara Elizabeth Yar Khan is a Disability advocate, public speaker and United Nations humanitarian 

Yar Khan was born in Hyderabad, India to an Indian father and English mother, and was raised in Canada. 

Her interest in humanitarianism began while watching a telethon to raise money for children in Africa, when she was six years old.

Education and career 
Yar Khan studied at the University of Guelph, earning a B.A. in international development, before attending Paul H. Nitze School of Advanced International Studies in Italy. After graduating college, earning her Master's in public policy, she travelled in 2001 with the United Nations World Food Programme to Ecuador to begin her career as a humanitarian. For 15 years she worked in different humanitarian roles in 10 different countries, including work as a fundraising officer and child protection specialist for UNICEF.

In 2007, at age 30, Yar Khan was diagnosed with the rare muscle-wasting disease hereditary inclusion body myopathy. While at first she hid her diagnosis, fearing people would begin to doubt her capabilities, she began to open up as the disease progressed. She was advised to quit her career to go home and move in with her parents upon her diagnosis, but instead continued working, travelling to Angola with UNICEF. The next year, when Yar Khan travelled to China as member of the 2008 Sichuan earthquake emergency response, she needed the use of a leg brace. Two years later, in 2010, she used two canes and two leg braces on a humanitarian trip to Haiti in response to the earthquake.

Currently, Yar Khan works at the International Human Trafficking Institute, part of the National Center for Civil and Human Rights in Atlanta. In 2019, she did a Ted Talk discussing the importance of courage and fear coexisting together.

Achievements and awards 
Yar Khan began horseback riding in 2014, and was recognized as the Professional Association of Therapeutic Horsemanship International's 2015 Adult Equestrian of the Year. To demonstrate two common themes from her public speaking career, courage and fear, Yar Khan embarked on a 12-day trip at the Grand Canyon, including 4 days spent descending the area on horseback and another eight days White Water Rafting in the Colorado River.

In 2015, she was given the Driving Force Award from Porsche North America and the National Center for Civil and Human Rights, for her activism and community engagement.

Atlanta magazine named Yar Khan as one of their Women Making A Mark, in 2018. That same year, she was honored with an Outstanding Voice Award from Atlanta Business Chronicle for advancing equality in the business community in Atlanta. As of July 2022, a documentary about Yar Khan, called Her Inescapable Brave Mission, created with filmmaker Sam Pollard and executive producer Brenda Robinson is in the works.

See also 

 List of disability rights activists

References 

Humanitarians
Year of birth missing (living people)
Living people